Alois, Hereditary Prince and Regent of Liechtenstein, Count of Rietberg (Alois Philipp Maria; born 11 June 1968), is the eldest son of Hans-Adam II, Prince of Liechtenstein, and Countess Marie Kinsky von Wchinitz und Tettau. The heir apparent to the throne of Liechtenstein, Alois has also been regent of the country since 15 August 2004. He is married to Duchess Sophie in Bavaria.

Life and career
Alois attended the Liechtenstein Grammar School in Ebenholz (Vaduz) and then the Royal Military Academy Sandhurst in the United Kingdom. He served in the Coldstream Guards in Hong Kong and London for six months before entering the University of Salzburg, from which he earned a master's degree in jurisprudence in 1993.

Until 1996, Alois worked at a firm of chartered accountants in London. In May of that year, he returned to Vaduz and became active in managing the princely families' finances.

In the 2003 Liechtenstein constitutional referendum, Hans-Adam II retained his sweeping powers (the right to veto laws and elect judges). On Liechtenstein Day in 2004, Hans-Adam II formally turned the power of making day-to-day governmental decisions over to Alois, preparing for the transition to a new generation. Hans-Adam II remains head of state.

On 27 November 2005, Liechtenstein voters rejected an initiative that would prohibit abortion and birth control in the principality. The initiative was supported by Roman Catholic Archbishop Wolfgang Haas. Alois was initially sympathetic to the proposal, but he became neutral during the run-up to the vote. Instead, a government-sponsored counter proposal was ratified.

In 2011, Alois threatened to exercise his princely veto if voters approved a forthcoming referendum to legalize abortion in the principality. Such a veto was not necessary, as the voters rejected the proposal.

Following the prince's threat, an initiative called "" ("So that your voice counts") was launched to change the constitution of Liechtenstein to prevent the prince from vetoing legislation approved in referendums. The referendum was held on 1 July 2012, and 76% of voters upheld the prince's power to veto referendum results.

Marriage and children
On 3 July 1993 at St. Florin's Cathedral in Vaduz, Alois married Duchess Sophie in Bavaria, now also Hereditary Princess of Liechtenstein and Countess of Rietberg.

They have four children:
 Prince Joseph Wenzel Maximilian Maria of Liechtenstein, Count of Rietberg (born 24 May 1995 at the Portland Hospital in London)
 Princess Marie-Caroline Elisabeth Immaculata of Liechtenstein, Countess of Rietberg (born 17 October 1996 in Grabs, Canton of St. Gallen)
 Prince Georg Antonius Constantin Maria of Liechtenstein, Count of Rietberg (born 20 April 1999 in Grabs, Canton of St. Gallen)
 Prince Nikolaus Sebastian Alexander Maria of Liechtenstein, Count of Rietberg (born 6 December 2000 in Grabs, Canton of St. Gallen)

Honours

National 
  : Grand Star of the Order of Merit of the Principality of Liechtenstein.

Foreign 
  : Grand Decoration of Honour in Gold with Sash for Services to the Republic of Austria (08/06/2000).
  : Recipient of the King Willem-Alexander Inauguration Medal (30/04/2013).
  : Recipient of the King Carl XVI Gustaf's Jubilee Commemorative Medal for the 70th Birthday (30/04/2016).
  : Grand Cross pro Merito Melitensi – civilian special class – (16/09/2011).

See also 
 List of current heirs apparent

References

External links

Official website

1968 births
20th-century Roman Catholics
21st-century Roman Catholics
Coldstream Guards officers
Graduates of the Royal Military Academy Sandhurst
Heirs apparent
Liechtenstein Roman Catholics
Living people
Princes of Liechtenstein
Regents
University of Salzburg alumni
Sons of monarchs

Recipients of the Grand Decoration with Sash for Services to the Republic of Austria
Recipients of the Order pro Merito Melitensi